Rockbridge County is a county in the Shenandoah Valley on the western edge of the Commonwealth of Virginia. As of the 2020 census, the population was 22,650. Its county seat is the city of Lexington. Rockbridge County completely surrounds the independent cities of Buena Vista and Lexington. The Bureau of Economic Analysis combines the independent cities of Buena Vista and Lexington with Rockbridge County for statistical purposes.

History

Rockbridge County was established in October 1777, from parts of now neighboring Augusta and Botetourt counties, and the first county elections were held in May 1778. Rockbridge County was named for Natural Bridge, a notable landmark in the southern portion of the county. Rockbridge County was formed during an act of assembly intended to reduce the amount of travel to the nearest courthouse, and to ensure trials were held fairly, and among friends rather than strangers. The first court session in Rockbridge County was held at the home of Samuel Wallace on April 7, 1778. Slaves were far fewer in Rockbridge County than in many parts of Virginia, and, thus, the anti-slavery movement was stronger in Rockbridge than in other Virginia areas. For instance, several faculty members at Washington College (now Washington and Lee University) vigorously opposed slavery. However, many of the wealthiest residents of Rockbridge County owned slaves and passed down those slaves to their widows and children.

Cyrus McCormick invented the reaper near Steele's Tavern at the northern end of the county.

Geography
The hilly terrain of Rockbridge County was densely wooded in the eighteenth century. Its more level areas have now been cleared and turned to agriculture. The county is bordered by high ridges along its NW and SE borders, with the crests running NE-SW. The terrain's highest point ( ASL) is Rocky Mountain on its SE border with Amherst County.

Adjacent counties

 Bath County – northwest
 Augusta County – northeast
 Nelson County – east
 Amherst County – southeast
 Bedford County – south
 Botetourt County – southwest
 Alleghany County – west

National protected areas

 Blue Ridge Parkway (part)
 George Washington National Forest (part)
 Jefferson National Forest (part)
 United States National Radio Quiet Zone (part)

Major highways

Demographics

2020 census

Note: the US Census treats Hispanic/Latino as an ethnic category. This table excludes Latinos from the racial categories and assigns them to a separate category. Hispanics/Latinos can be of any race.

2000 Census
As of the 2000 United States census, there were 20,808 people, 8,486 households, and 6,075 families in the county. The population density was 35 people per square mile (13/km2). There were 9,550 housing units at an average density of 16 per square mile (6/km2). The racial makeup of the county was 95.42% White, 2.97% Black or African American, 0.26% Native American, 0.44% Asian, 0.12% from other races, and 0.78% from two or more races. 0.58% of the population were Hispanic or Latino of any race.

There were 8,486 households, out of which 29.20% had children under the age of 18 living with them, 57.50% were married couples living together, 9.50% had a female householder with no husband present, and 28.40% were non-families. 23.90% of all households were made up of individuals, and 9.90% had someone living alone who was 65 years of age or older. The average household size was 2.43 and the average family size was 2.84.

The county population contained 22.20% under the age of 18, 7.90% from 18 to 24, 27.20% from 25 to 44, 27.10% from 45 to 64, and 15.70% who were 65 years of age or older. The median age was 40 years. For every 100 females there were 100.40 males. For every 100 females age 18 and over, there were 98.00 males.

The median income for a household in the county was $36,035, and the median income for a family was $41,324. Males had a median income of $28,217 versus $19,946 for females. The per capita income for the county was $18,356. About 6.60% of families and 9.60% of the population were below the poverty line, including 9.40% of those under age 18 and 9.60% of those age 65 or over.

Media
 The Rockbridge Advocate (monthly magazine)
 The News-Gazette (weekly newspaper)
 The Rockbridge Report (weekly broadcast and website, Washington & Lee University journalism students)
 EyeOnVirginia.com (videos and interviews with Rockbridge area newsmakers)

Communities
The independent cities of Buena Vista and Lexington (incorporated 1892 and 1966 respectively) are enclaves within the boundaries of Rockbridge County, and are not a part of the county. Lexington is the county seat, despite its independent status, and shares three constitutional officers with Rockbridge County: Sheriff, Clerk of the Circuit Court and Commonwealth's Attorney. Buena Vista does not share constitutional officers with either Rockbridge County or Lexington.

Towns
 Glasgow
 Goshen

Census-designated places
 East Lexington
 Fairfield

Unincorporated communities

 Brownsburg
 Collierstown
 Gilmore Mills
 Marlbrook 
 Mechanicsville
 Natural Bridge
 Natural Bridge Station
 Raphine
 Rockbridge Baths
 Steeles Tavern
 Vesuvius

Notable people
 Robert H. Adams (1792–1832), born in Rockbridge County, United States Senator from Mississippi
 John Allen (soldier) (1771–1813), born in Rockbridge County, a Kentucky political figure and colonel of militia, killed in the War of 1812
 Adam Rankin Alexander (1781–1848), born in Rockbridge County, United States Congressman from Tennessee
 Archibald Alexander (1772–1851), born in Rockbridge County, noted Presbyterian clergyman, president of Hampden–Sydney College and one of the founders of and the first professor of Princeton Theological Seminary
 Samuel Dale (1772–1841), born in Rockbridge County, American frontiersman, known as the ""Daniel Boone of Alabama" and a veteran of the Creek War of 1813–1814
 Pierre Daura, Spanish/Catalan painter, naturalized American
Jessie Benton Frémont (1824-1902), American writer and political activist, born in Rockbridge County
 William C. Friday (1920–2012), American educator, public servant and President of University of North Carolina (1956–1986), born in Raphine, Rockbridge County.
 Sam Houston (1793–1863), born in Rockbridge County, the only man to be Governor of two U.S. states (Texas, Tennessee). Also, victor at the Battle of San Jacinto, President of the Republic of Texas, and U.S. Senator..
 Stonewall Jackson, General in the C.S.A. Army, lived in Lexington, the county seat.
 Robert E. Lee, former commander of the Confederate Army of Northern Virginia in the U.S. Civil War, who, after the war, accepted the presidency of Washington and Lee University (then Washington College)
 Sally Mann (born 1951), celebrated American photographer
 Charlie Manuel, American and Japanese baseball player and World Series champion manager of the Philadelphia Phillies
 Rick Mast, Fan favorite Winston Cup and Busch Series driver
 Cyrus McCormick, inventor of the reaper
 Miles Poindexter (1868-1946), Graduate of Fancy Hill Academy and Washington & Lee University, United States Senator from Washington, 1920 Republican Primary Presidential Candidate, United States Ambassador to Peru, Author, retired to and died in his home in Arnolds Valley
 Samuel B. Pryor, (1816–1866), First mayor of Dallas, TX. He was in the first class of the Virginia Military Institute.
 Archibald Roane, who later became governor of Tennessee, lived in Rockbridge County in the 1780s
  Absalom Willis Robertson, U.S. Senator, father of Pat Robertson
 Pat Robertson (b. 1930), American minister, university president and media figure
 Archibald Stuart, Founder of Phi Beta Kappa
 Cy Twombly, American ex-patriate painter, born in Lexington

Politics

See also
 National Register of Historic Places listings in Rockbridge County, Virginia
 FOR Swimming

References

External links
 Rockbridge County Tourism Website – dining, lodging, events and attractions

 
Virginia counties
1777 establishments in Virginia
Populated places established in 1777
Counties on the James River (Virginia)
Counties of Appalachia